Vojinović or Vojinovic is a Serbian surname derived from a masculine given name Vojin. Notable people with the surname include:

Noble families:
House of Vojinović (modern), Serb noble family in the Bay of Kotor and Dalmatia active in the late 18th and early 19th century
Vojinović noble family, mediaeval Serbian noble family which during the 14th century played an important role in the Serbian Empire

Surname:
Altoman Vojinović (fl. 1335–59), Serbian magnate who served Emperor Stefan Dušan
Djordje Vojinović (1936–2016), American politician from the state of Ohio
Đorđe Vojinović (1833–1895), Croatian Serb politician
Draško Vojinović (born 1984), Serbian football player
Kosta Vojinović (1891–1917), known as Kosovac, Serbian soldier who fought in World War I
Lujo Vojinović (1864–1951), Serbian writer, politician, and diplomat
Miloš Vojinović (fl. 1332), Serbian nobleman who served Emperor Stefan Dušan
Vojislav Vojinović, 14th-century Serbian nobleman who held the title "Duke of Gacko"
Vojislava Vojinović (1322–1347), Serb voivode (military commander, Duke) and magnate (velikaš)
Zorica Vojinović (born 1958), former Yugoslav/Serbian Olympic handball player

See also
Vojin
Vojnić
Živojinović

Serbian surnames